Lena is a female given name, usually meaning “light”, “bright” and “shining”. Lena is popular in Arabic, Hindi, Swedish, French, Finnish, and was the most popular name for girls born in Poland in 2013.

People with the given name 

 Lena (actress), Malayalam film actress
 Lena Ackebo (born 1950), Swedish comic creator
 Lena Åkesson (born 1967), Swedish boxer
 Lena Anderssen, Faroese-Canadian singer-songwriter
 Lena Ashwell (1872–1957), British actress
 Lena Asplund (born 1956), Swedish politician
 Lena Baker (1900–1945), American convicted of murder
 Lena Bergman (born 1943), Swedish social services employee
 Lena Bergström (born 1961), Swedish textiles and glass designer
 Léna Bernstein (1906–1932), German aviator 
 Lena Berntsson (born 1978), Swedish athlete
 Lena Northern Buckner (1875-1939), American social worker
 Lena Burke (born 1978), Cuban singer and actress
 Lena Chamamyan (born 1980), Syrian singer of Armenian origin
 Lena Christ (1881–1920), German writer
 Lena Doolin Mason (1864–1924), American Methodist preacher and poet
 Lena Dunham (born 1986), American filmmaker and actress
 Lena Düpont (born 1986), German politician
 Lena Einhorn (born 1954), Swedish director, writer and physician
 Lena Endre (born 1955), Swedish theatre, film and television actress
 Lena Erdil (born 1989), Turkish windsurfer
 Lena Eriksson (born 1972), Swedish breaststroke swimmer
 Lena Fiagbe, British soul singer-songwriter
 Lena Frier Kristiansen (born 1983), Danish badminton player
 Lena Gercke (born 1988), German model
 Lena Forsén (born 1951), Swedish Playboy Playmate
 Lena Hallin (born 1961), Swedish Air Force major general
 Lena Häcki (born 1995), Swiss biathlete
 Lena Hades (born 1959), Russian painter
 Lena Tracy Hanks (1879–1944), American psychologist 
 Lena Headey (born 1973), British actress
 Lena Horne (1917–2010), American singer and actress
 Lena Jeger, Baroness Jeger (1915–2007), British politician
 Lena Jensen (born 1973), Norwegian politician
  (born 1980), Norwegian cross-country skier
 Lena Johansson (born 1969), Swedish politician
 Lena Kang (born 2002), South Korean singer, member of girl group GWSN
 Lena Adelsohn Liljeroth (born 1955), Swedish politician
 Lena Lotzen (born 1993), German footballer
 Lena Machado (1903–1974) Native Hawaiian singer, composer, and ukulele player
 Lena Malkus (born 1993), German long jumper
 Lena Martell (born 1940), Scottish singer
 Lena McEwan (1927–2011), Australian plastic surgeon
 Lena McLin (born 1928), American composer
 Lena Meyer-Landrut (born 1991), German singer, winner of the Eurovision Song Contest 2010
 Lena Nazaryan (born 1983), Armenian journalist and politician
 Lena Olin (born 1955), Swedish actress
 Lena Platonos (born 1951), Greek musician,  pianist and composer
 Lena Raine (born 1984), American video game composer and producer
 Lena Sadick, lawn and indoor bowler
 Lena Sandlin-Hedman (born 1969), Swedish politician
 Lena Valaitis (born 1943), Lithuanian-German singer
 Lena Waithe (born 1984), American screenwriter, producer, and actress
 Lena Yada (born 1978), Japanese-American model
 Lena Zavaroni (1963–1999), Scottish singer

Nickname

Jennie Lena, stage name of Jennie Willemstijn (born 1977), Dutch singer and songwriter
Lena Asmus, nickname of Helene Asmus (born 1982), Russian and German rhythmic gymnast
 Lena Blackburne, nickname of Russell Aubrey Blackburne (1886 – 1968), American baseball infielder, manager, coach, and scout
Lena Brogren, nickname of Ulla-Britt Brogren (1929 – 2005), was a Swedish actress
 Lena Connell, stage name of Adelin Beatrice Connell, also known professionally as Beatrice Cundy, (1875 – 1949), British suffragette and a well-known photographer
 Lena Crittenden/Lee Crittenden, pennames of Lela E. Buis, American speculative fiction writer, playwright, poet and artist
 Lena d'Água, stage name of Helena Maria de Jesus Águas (born 1956), Portuguese singer
 Lena Farugia, stage name of Nicolina Elizabeth Farruggia (1951 – 2019), American-born South African actress, screenwriter, director and producer
 Lena Hall, stage name of Celina Consuela Gabriella Carvajal (born 1980), American actress and singer
 Lena Herzog, stage name of Elena Herzog (née Pisetski; born 1970), Russian-American visual artist and photographer
 Lena Katina, stage name of Elena Sergeevna Katina (born 1984), Russian singer
 Lena Michaëlis, nickname of Helena Cornelia Michaëlis (1905 – 1982), Dutch discus thrower
 Lena Milman, nickname of Angelena Frances Milman (1862-1914), British translator, critic and architectural historian
 Lena Neuner, nickname of Magdalena Neuner (married name Magdalena Holzer; born 1987), German biathlete
 Lena Ovchynnikova, nickname of Oléna Serhíyivna Ovchýnnikova (born 1987), Ukrainian kickboxer and mixed martial artist
 Lena Oxton, fictional Overwatch character, known as Tracer (Overwatch)
 Lena Park, stage name of Park Jung-hyun (born 1976), Korean singer, also known as Park Jung Hyun (박정현)
 Lena Philipsson, stage name of Maria Magdalena Philipsson (born 1966), Swedish singer, also known as "Lena Ph" 
 Lena Piskun, nickname of Elena Mikhaylovna Piskun (born 1978), Belarusian artistic gymnast 
 Lena Purcell, nickname of Samuelene Purcell (1898 – 1982), New Zealand shop assistant and trade unionist
 Lena Rice, nickname of Helena Bertha Grace Rice (1866 – 1907), Irish tennis player
 Lena Ruru, nickname of Rina Matewai Ruru (1902 – 1977), New Zealand community leader, sportswoman, pianist and Māori welfare worker
 Lena Styles, nickname of William Graves Styles (1899 – 1956), American baseball catcher
 Lena Tretyakova, stage name of Elena Nikolaevna Tretyakova (born 1988), Russian singer

Fictional characters
 The female protagonist in an Ole and Lena joke
Lena, played by Marion Cotillard in the 2006 film Toi et Moi
Lena, played by Emma Levie in the 2011 film Lena
Lena, played by Natalie Portman in the 2018 film Annihilation
Lena, in the book series Fablehaven
 Lena Adams, in the Grant County, Georgia series of books
Lena Duchannes, in the Beautiful Creatures series of books
Lena Adams Foster, in American TV series The Fosters
Lena Grove, in the William Faulkner novel Light In August
Lena Haloway, in the Delirium series of books by Lauren Oliver
Lena Hatun, in Turkish TV series Kuruluş: Osman
 Lena Kaligaris, in the Sisterhood of the Traveling Pants series of books
 Lena Luthor, Lex Luthor's sister in DC Comics
 Lena "Tracer" Oxton, in the video games Overwatch and Heroes of the Storm
 Lena Seguret, in The Returned television show
 Lena De Spell, in the DuckTales television show
Lenna Charlotte Tycoon, one of the main characters of Final Fantasy V
 Lena Younger, in the A Raisin In The Sun play
 Lena Tikhonova in the Everlasting Summer game

People with the surname
Jeffrey Lena (born 1958), American lawyer
Jennie Lena, Dutch singer-songwriter
Nijaz Lena (born 1986), Macedonian footballer

See also
Leni (name)
Lenna (disambiguation)
Linna (disambiguation)
Lanna (disambiguation)

Notes 

Czech feminine given names
Feminine given names
English feminine given names
German feminine given names
Greek feminine given names
Indian feminine given names
Norwegian feminine given names
Polish feminine given names
Russian feminine given names
Scandinavian feminine given names
Slovak feminine given names
Spanish feminine given names
Swedish feminine given names